Khvod Bechar (also Romanized as Khowd Bechar) is a village in Howmeh Rural District, in the Central District of Masal County, Gilan Province, Iran. At the 2006 census, its population was 691, in 180 families.

References 

Populated places in Masal County